Latu Latunipulu (born 12 March 1997) is an Australian-born Tongan rugby union player. His preferred position is wing. He is a Tongan international.

Career
Latunipulu was born in Australia, and played for the Randwick club in the Shute Shield, where his performances earned him a call-up to the Australia U20 side, although he did not feature due to injury.
In September 2022, he moved to Italy to join United Rugby Championship side Zebre Parma as Joker Medicale until December 2022.

International career
While at Bourg-en-Bresse, he made his international debut for Tonga against the French Barbarians and later against Romania, scoring a try.

References

External links
itsrugby profile

Living people
Australian rugby union players
Tongan rugby union players
Tonga international rugby union players
Sydney (NRC team) players
Aviron Bayonnais players
Union Sportive Bressane players
Zebre Parma players
Rugby union wings
1997 births
Rugby union players from Sydney